Zouping is a county-level city of Shandong province.

Geography
The city is located on the northern edge of the mountainous central portion of the province.

Administrative divisions
As 2012, this City is divided to 3 subdistricts and 13 towns.

Subdistricts
 Daixi Subdistrict
 Huangshan Subdistrict
 Gaoxin Subdistrict

Towns

Climate

Economy
Zouping is one of the richest counties in the country. Its economic prosperity has depended on the development of the aluminum industry.

The Qixing Group and Hongqiao Group, two large players in the aluminum production industry and pillars of local industry are based in the county.

References 

 
County-level divisions of Shandong
Binzhou
Cities in Shandong